Francis David Fielding (born 4 April 1988) is an English professional footballer who plays as a goalkeeper for Stoke City.

He began his career at Blackburn Rovers in the Premier League. He spent time on loan at Wycombe Wanderers, Northampton Town, Rochdale, Leeds United, and Derby County, before making a permanent move to Derby County. In 2013, he signed for Bristol City, spending six years with the club until 2019.

Fielding has played internationally for England twice at under-19 and twelve times at under-21 level.

Club career

Blackburn Rovers
Born in Blackburn, Lancashire, Fielding is a product of Blackburn Rovers Academy. He joined League Two side Wycombe Wanderers on 28 September 2007 on a three-month loan deal alongside Bolton Wanderers' Polish goalkeeper Przemysław Kazimierczak. The deal was made due to Wycombe having injury problems with both first team goalkeepers Scott Shearer and Jamie Young. Fielding made his debut a day after signing on loan, keeping a clean sheet in a 1–0 win at Bradford City. His loan was extended until the end of the season on 10 January 2008 and he managed to keep his place after the return to fitness of Young.

He then joined Northampton Town on loan for three months on 9 September where he made 12 appearances before returning to Blackburn.

Fielding moved out on loan again, this time to Rochdale on 6 January 2009, where he starred before eventually featuring in an unsuccessful playoff attempt, losing to Gillingham in the semi-finals. On 2 February, Fielding extended his stay with Rochdale until the end of the 2008–09 season.

On 29 September 2009, Fielding joined Leeds United on a one-month emergency loan to cover for the injured Shane Higgs. He was named as an unused substitute in Leeds' game against Carlisle. He was unavailable for Leeds' Football League Trophy game against Darlington as he was called up to England under-21 team. Fielding played his first game for the reserve team against Hartlepool United on 13 October. After being unable to displace Casper Ankergren, On 26 October, Leeds announced they would not be renewing his loan and he returned to Blackburn. On 1 February 2010, Fielding returned to Rochdale on loan until the end of the 2009–10 season and made his debut in the 1–0 defeat at Bury, eventually helping Rochdale to a third-place finish and promotion to Football League One.

Fielding again started the 2010–11 season out of the first team picture as Paul Robinson's understudy. He was linked with a move to Championship side Derby County. The interest caused Fielding to issue a "come-and-get-me" plea, stating "It is the worst feeling when you are training all week and not playing - so if anyone wants me on loan, I'm available!" He joined Derby on a four-week emergency loan on 15 October 2010 and went straight into the squad for the home match against Preston North End the next day, keeping a clean sheet on his debut as the team ran out 3–0 winners. The loan was extended for an additional month on 13 November, after his seven appearances had reaped three clean sheets and 15 points from a possible 21 as Derby moved to fourth in the table. After Stephen Bywater returned from his wrist injury, Fielding returned to Blackburn in December. He was then named on the subs bench for Blackburn to cover from Mark Bunn when Paul Robinson picked up an injury. In February 2011, after Bywater and Saul Deeney picked up injuries, Fielding returned to Derby on loan. Though the deal was initially announced as being until the end of the 2010–11 season, Fielding's two month emergency loan deal with the club in October and November meant that he could only remain at the club for an additional month, with his second stay ending after the away fixture at Crystal Palace on 19 March 2011, though Fielding would train with the Derby squad for the remainder of the season.

Having left Derby 7th in the table, Fielding returned to the club in 19th after it had claimed only six points from the thirteen fixtures since his departure. In his first five games back at Derby, Fielding kept two clean sheets helping The Rams to an important wins against Sheffield United and Swansea City and draws with Barnsley and Crystal Palace. The 8 points from six games played in Fielding's second loan spell,  came in stark contrast to the mere six point return from the 12 games since Fielding's previous loan spell finished.

Derby County
On 9 May 2011, it was announced that Fielding had signed a three-year deal subject to the FA and Premier League's approval, for a fee of £400,000. On 17 September 2011, Fielding was sent off after 67 seconds in the East Midlands derby match against Nottingham Forest, despite this Derby still won the match 2–1. After his ban Fielding was restored to Derby's starting line up and has since been impressive, especially as Derby played out a one-all draw with Southampton and during a run of games in January 2012 where he recorded a clean sheet in 4 straight games. Fielding featured in every minute of Derby's first team action since the game he missed against Millwall in September 2011 but this run was ended on 21 April 2012, in the penultimate game at Portsmouth when Fielding was substituted off at half-time due to a groin injury, which ruled him out of the final game of the season at home to Peterborough United. Fielding kept 12 clean sheets in the 47 games he played in during the 2011–12 season and finished 3rd in the fans Player of the Season vote.

Fielding started the first ten games 2012–13 season, keeping his 1st clean sheet against local rivals Nottingham Forest, resulting in a 1–0 victory at the City Ground. Fielding missed the game against Brighton & Hove Albion on 6 October 2012 due to a groin injury. Clough was hopeful that Fielding would return for the game against former club Blackburn Rovers on 20 October 2012. However, Fielding was ruled out for a further month. Fielding returned to the first team squad 17 November however, Fielding had to be content with a place on the substitutes bench as he lost his place in the first team to Adam Legzdins. Therefore, Fielding was limited to playing as an overage goalkeeper in the under-21 league, Clough did praise Fielding's and said he was getting closer to regaining his place. In March 2013, Fielding regained his place in the starting eleven in Derby's 2–1 win against Leicester City after a 30-game absence lasting five and a half months. In April 2013 five weeks after his return, Fielding was sent off for a professional foul in Derby's 3–1 win against Peterborough United, Fielding's second red card for Derby After Derby signed Burnley keeper Lee Grant in May, Fielding was made available for transfer with a year left on his contract. In June, Derby accepted a transfer bid of £200,000 for Fielding from Bristol City.

Bristol City
On 26 June 2013, Fielding joined Bristol City, who had just been relegated to League One. He made his debut on 3 August 2013, in a 2–2 draw against Bradford City. The club made a disastrous start to the season, winning just four points from their opening eight games as Fielding conceded nineteen goals. He was subsequently replaced as first choice 'keeper by Elliot Parish. He was released by Bristol City at the end of the 2018–19 season.

Millwall
On 28 June 2019, Fielding joined Millwall. He made his debut on 3 August 2019 but was replaced in the 43rd minute of Millwall's 1–0 opening day victory against Preston North End due to injury.

Stoke City
On 1 December 2021, Fielding joined Stoke City on a short-term contract to provide cover following an injury to Josef Bursik. In January 2022, Fielding signed a contract extension keeping him at the club for the remainder of the 2021–22 season. On 25 March 2022, Fielding joined Salford City on a seven-day emergency loan. Fielding signed a one-year contract with Stoke for the 2022–23 season.

International career
Fielding was capped twice by the England under-19s, playing in games against the Netherlands and Czech Republic in May 2007. He made his England under-21 debut on 18 November 2008, replacing the injured Joe Lewis in the 33rd minute at Bramall Lane against the Czech Republic.

Fielding received his first England call-up on 10 August 2010 for the friendly against Hungary, after Ben Foster withdrew from the squad. England won the match 2–1, with Fielding an unused substitute.

Fielding was called up to the under-21 squad for the 2011 UEFA European Under-21 Championship. Although Fielding was 23 at the time of his call up, he was under 21 when the qualification phase began, making him eligible for the tournament. Fielding played the full 90 minutes of a pre-tournament friendly against the Norway under-21s on 5 June, keeping a clean sheet as England won 2–0.

Career statistics

Honours
Rochdale
Football League Two third-place promotion: 2009–10

Bristol City
Football League Trophy: 2014–15
Football League One: 2014–15

Individual
PFA Team of the Year: 2014–15 League One

References

External links

1988 births
Living people
Footballers from Blackburn
English footballers
England youth international footballers
England under-21 international footballers
Association football goalkeepers
Blackburn Rovers F.C. players
Wycombe Wanderers F.C. players
Northampton Town F.C. players
Rochdale A.F.C. players
Leeds United F.C. players
Derby County F.C. players
Bristol City F.C. players
Millwall F.C. players
Stoke City F.C. players
English Football League players
Salford City F.C. players